Mukhtar Suleiman (born 10 October 1998) is a Somali footballer who currently plays for Katwijk.

Club career
Suleiman played in the lower leagues of the Netherlands, notably scoring fifteen goals for Hollandia before a move to Oostzaan.

International career
Suleiman was called up to the Somalia national football team in March 2022. He scored in a 3–1 friendly loss to Tanzanian club team Azam.

Career statistics

Club

Notes

International

References

1998 births
Living people
Association football forwards
Somalian footballers
Somalia international footballers
Dutch footballers
Vierde Divisie players
Derde Divisie players
Tweede Divisie players
HVV Hollandia players
OFC Oostzaan players
VV Katwijk players